Mika Zibanejad (born 18 April 1993) is a Swedish professional ice hockey centre and alternate captain for the New York Rangers of the National Hockey League (NHL). Zibanejad was selected sixth overall in the 2011 NHL Entry Draft by the Ottawa Senators. He made the Senators lineup out of training camp to start the 2011–12 season, but was returned to Djurgårdens IF in Sweden after scoring one point in nine NHL games with Ottawa. On 18 July 2016, after five seasons within the Senators organization, Zibanejad was traded to the Rangers.

Zibanejad has represented Sweden on the international stage, helping the junior team win the 2012 World Junior Ice Hockey Championships and the senior team win the 2018 IIHF World Championship.

Club career
Zibanejad played association football as a child before deciding to pursue hockey. He began playing hockey at the age of six in Hammarby IF, where he played a total of seven seasons before the club went bankrupt in 2008.

Zibanejad then moved to AIK IF's youth organization for the following season, where he began playing junior hockey. He was acquired by Djurgårdens IF for the 2009–10 season to play in the organization's J18-team and J20-team. Zibanejad made his Elitserien debut on 7 December 2010, against Luleå HF, and scored his first Elitserien goal on 15 January 2011, against Tuomas Tarkki of Modo Hockey. He was drafted in the sixth round of the 2010 KHL Junior Draft by Lokomotiv Yaroslavl, 129th overall.

On 7 February 2011, Zibanejad signed a two-year contract extension with Djurgården. Zibanejad became a regular player in the senior roster after his debut, playing in 26 of the remaining 29 games. He scored five goals and nine points, which made him the third most successful junior player 18 years or younger in the organization and playing with the senior team, behind Fredrik Bremberg and Jacob Josefson. On 5 January 2012, Zibanejad scored the game-winning goal for Sweden at the 2012 World Junior Ice Hockey Championships in overtime of the gold medal game against Russia.

Ottawa Senators

On 13 July 2011, Zibanejad signed a three-year, entry-level contract with the Ottawa Senators, the team that drafted him sixth overall in the 2011 NHL Entry Draft. After an impressive training camp, Zibanejad joined the Senators for their first game of the 2011–12 season. He registered his first career NHL point in his first game, an assist on a goal by Filip Kuba in a 5–3 loss to the Detroit Red Wings. After just one point in nine games played, Zibanejad was reassigned to his most recent club, Djurgårdens IF, on 26 October.

In June 2012, Zibanejad was rumoured to be a key part of a package Ottawa was offering to the Columbus Blue Jackets in exchange for disgruntled superstar Rick Nash. The offer was allegedly withdrawn when Columbus general manager Scott Howson informed the Senators Nash was unwilling to waive his no-trade clause to accept a move to Ottawa.

In August 2012, the Senators announced Zibanejad would spend the 2012–13 season in North America, either in the NHL with the Senators or with the club's American Hockey League (AHL) affiliate, the Binghamton Senators. Due to the NHL lockout, Zibanejad began the season with Binghamton, where he registered 11 points in 23 games while battling injuries. He was called up to Ottawa on 28 January 2013, and played in his first NHL game of the season on 29 January against the Washington Capitals, a game in which he was selected as the first star. The following night, on 30 January in a game against the Montreal Canadiens, Zibanejad scored his first career NHL goal. The goal came on the power play against goaltender Peter Budaj and with assists from Colin Greening and André Benoit. In the 2015–16 season, Zibanejad scored a career high 21 goals with 30 assists.

New York Rangers
On 18 July 2016, Zibanejad was traded by the Senators to the New York Rangers (along with a second-round pick in the 2018 NHL Entry Draft) in exchange for Derick Brassard and a seventh-round pick in the 2018 NHL Entry Draft. He had one year remaining on his contract before becoming eligible as a restricted free agent whereas Brassard had three left on his.

On 20 November 2016, during a game against the Florida Panthers, Zibanejad suffered a gruesome injury in overtime when he went hard with his left leg into the boards while trying to get in front of Reilly Smith. After the game, which the Rangers eventually lost 3–2 in a shootout, it was announced that he had broken his left fibula and would miss six to eight weeks. He returned to the Rangers lineup against the Dallas Stars on 17 January 2017; he scored two goals in the 7–6 Rangers loss.

On 20 April 2017, Zibanejad scored the overtime winning goal in Game 5 of the 2017 NHL Eastern Conference quarterfinal. He met his former team, the Senators, in the Eastern Conference Semi-Finals, in which Ottawa would triumph in six games. He scored one goal and recorded four assists against his former team for a total of two goals and seven assists during the 2017 Stanley Cup playoffs.

On 26 July 2017, Zibanejad signed a five-year, $26.75 million contract extension with the Rangers.

Zibanejad scored a goal and three assists in the Rangers' 2019–20 season opener on 3 October 2019, and followed that game with his third career hat-trick against the Ottawa Senators on 5 October. He also posted an assist in the game, becoming the sixth player in NHL history with four-point games in each of the first two games of the season, and the first player to do so since John Cullen of the Pittsburgh Penguins in 1990. He was the second player in Rangers history to post eight points through the first two games of the season, the fourth in franchise history to score six or more points in that span, and the first in both cases since Rod Gilbert in 1976. Zibanejad's game on 5 October made him the first Rangers player with an even strength goal, a power play goal, and a short-handed goal in an away game since Petr Nedved in 2000, and the first Ranger to do so in any game since Derek Stepan in 2014. On 8 October, he was named NHL's First Star of the Week.

On 5 March 2020, Zibanejad became the third player in Rangers history to score 5 goals in a game in a 6–5 win over the Capitals, joining Don Murdoch, who set the mark on 12 October 1976 against the Minnesota North Stars, and Mark Pavelich on 23 February 1983 versus the Hartford Whalers. Among Zibanejad's tallies was the overtime winner, making him only the second player in NHL history to complete the quintet of goals in the extra period.  (The other was Sergei Fedorov, who did the same on 26 December 1996, also against Washington.)

After scoring only three goals in 27 games to start the 2020–21 NHL season, Zibanejad scored a natural hat trick on 17 March 2021 in the second period of a game against the Philadelphia Flyers. That same game, he tied the NHL record for most points in one period set in 1978 by Bryan Trottier with 6. The Rangers eventually won the game 9–0. He scored another hat trick a week later on 25 March in a subsequent game against the Flyers, a match the Rangers won 8–3. Accomplishing these feats, he became the third NHL player to score a natural hat trick in consecutive games against the same opponent in a single season after Thomas Vanek and Peter Bondra.

On 25 April 2021, during a game against the Buffalo Sabres, Zibanejad scored his seventh career hat trick (third of the season). He became the first Rangers player with three hat tricks in a season since Marián Gáborík achieved the feat in the 2010–11 season.

On 10 October 2021, Zibanejad signed an eight-year contract extension with the Rangers.

On 18 January 2022, Zibanejad was voted to his first All-Star game through the NHL "Last Men In" fan vote. However, he decided not to attend due to personal reasons in Sweden. This was his first career All-Star selection.

International career
Internationally, Zibanejad has represented Sweden at both the under-18 and junior levels. On 5 January 2012, Zibanejad scored the gold medal-winning golden goal for Sweden in the 2012 World Junior Ice Hockey Championships against Russia in the tournament final; the game finished 1–0. On 20 May 2018, Zibanejad scored a goal in the final for Sweden to help them win the 2018 IIHF World Championship.

Personal life
Zibanejad was raised in Huddinge, Sweden. His father, Mehrdad, is from Iran and his mother, Ritva, is from Paltamo, Finland. Mehrdad, a Christian, left Iran in 1983 due to religious persecution following two years of mandatory military service in the Iran–Iraq War. 

Mika's maternal half-brother, Monir Kalgoum, is also an ice hockey player who played professionally for teams in several lower-tier European leagues, most notably Huddinge IK and AIK IF in Sweden's HockeyAllsvenskan and Milton Keynes Lightning in the United Kingdom. 

Zibanejad is fluent in English, Persian, Finnish and Swedish. 

Zibanejad is married to Irma Helin, a Swedish footballer and sportscaster.

Music career
Zibanejad is also a DJ and music producer. He has released 5 songs: "Forever" in 2017, "Can't Go Back Home" the following year, in 2018, "Moves," featuring Hot Shade and Mike Perry in 2019, followed by "Nobody," featuring Hot Shade, the same year, and "By My Side" in 2020, which features Hot Shade and Melina Borglowe.

Career statistics

Regular season and playoffs

International

Awards and honors

See also
Swedish Iranians
Sweden Finns

References

External links

 

1993 births
Living people
Binghamton Senators players
Djurgårdens IF Hockey players
National Hockey League All-Stars
National Hockey League first-round draft picks
New York Rangers players
Ottawa Senators draft picks
Ottawa Senators players
People from Huddinge Municipality
Ice hockey people from Stockholm
Swedish ice hockey centres
Swedish people of Finnish descent
Swedish people of Iranian descent
Sportspeople of Iranian descent